The lesser woodcreeper (Xiphorhynchus fuscus) is a species of bird in the woodcreeper subfamily (Dendrocolaptinae). It is found in eastern Brazil. Its natural habitats are subtropical or tropical moist lowland forest and subtropical or tropical moist montane forest.

References

External links
Lesser woodcreeper photo gallery VIREO

lesser woodcreeper
Birds of Brazil
lesser woodcreeper
Taxa named by Louis Jean Pierre Vieillot
Taxonomy articles created by Polbot